A list of films produced in the United Kingdom in 1959 (see 1959 in film):

1959

See also
 1959 in British music
 1959 in British television
 1959 in the United Kingdom

References

External links

1959
Films
Lists of 1959 films by country or language